Niv Art Movies is a film production company  in New Delhi state, India established in the year 2008. Shaji Mathew, a Delhi based Malayali is the proprietor of the firm. It has produced 6 Malayalam films  5 out of the 6 films produced by the company are directed by Sanal Kumar Sasidharan

Films
Dooram
Oraalppokkam
Ozhivudivasathe Kali
Sexy Durga
Unmadiyude Maranam
Chola

First film produced by Niv Art Movies is Dooram directed by Manu Kannanthanam. Niv Art Movies Co-Produced Oraalppokkam directed by Sanal Kumar Sasidharan and the association between the director and the production house thus started. Ozhivudivasathe Kali was the first independent production of Niv Art Movies with Sanal. The film won the best feature film award in Kerala State Film Awards 2015. Sexy Durga which was again directed by Sanal Kumar Sasidharan won the topmost award, the Tiger award in the International Film Festival Rotterdam

Awards
Kerala State Film Awards : Ozhivudivasathe Kali won the best film award in the Kerala State Film Awards in 2015 
Tiger Award in IFFR : Sexy Durga has bagged the biggest award in the International Film Festival Rotterdam. The film has become the first ever Indian film to bag the award.

Filmography

References
 

Indian companies established in 2008
Film production companies of Delhi